Confessions of the Maker is Crystal Eyes' fourth album released in 2005 by Heavy Fidelity. It is their first album to not have Mikael Dahl on vocals.

Track listing
"The Charioteer" - 4:30 
"Confessions of the Maker" - 5:50
"Northern Rage" - 4:49
"The Fools' Ballet" - 3:44
"The Terror" - 7:43
"Panic" - 3:44
"White Wolves" - 4:30
"The Burning Vision" - 5:03
"Revolution in the Shadowland" - 4:30
"Terminal Voyage" - 4:47
"Silent Angel" - 5:25

Credits
Daniel Heiman - Vocals
Mikael Dahl - Guitar
Jonathan Nyberg - Guitar
Claes Wikander - Bass Guitar
Stefan Svantesson - Drums

Production, recording, and mixing by Mikael Dahl and Claes Wikander at Crystal Sounds
Drums recorded by Andy LaRocque
Mastering by Dragan Tanaskovic
Cover artwork and logotype by Mattias Norén

2005 albums
Crystal Eyes albums